Ullica Christina Olofsdotter Segerstråle (born October 10, 1945) is a Finnish sociologist and historian of science who is professor of sociology at the Illinois Institute of Technology.

Segerstråle’s published nonfiction books include Defenders of the Truth: The Battle for Science in the Sociobiology Debate and Beyond (2000) and Nature’s Oracle: The Life and Work of W. D. Hamilton (2013), the latter of which is the first biography of evolutionary biologist W.D. Hamilton.

Her Ph.D. thesis described the sociobiology controversy of the 1970s, and it subsequently formed the basis of an article published in the first issue of Biology & Philosophy in 1986.

A Guggenheim Fellow in 2002, she was elected a member of the European Academy of Sciences and Arts in 2012. She is also a member of the Finnish Academy of Science and Letters and a fellow of the World Academy of Art and Science. She holds two M.S. degrees – one in organic chemistry and one in sociology – from the University of Helsinki, as well as an M.A. in communication from the University of Pennsylvania and a Ph.D. in sociology from Harvard University.


Books

Author
Defenders of the Truth: The Battle for Science in the Sociobiology Debate and Beyond (Oxford University Press, 2000)
Nature's Oracle: The Life and Work of W. D. Hamilton (Oxford University Press, 2013)

Editor
Beyond the Science Wars: The Missing Discourse about Science and Society (SUNY Press, 2000)

References

External links
Faculty page

Finnish sociologists
1945 births
Finnish emigrants to the United States
Living people
Finnish women academics
Finnish women sociologists
Illinois Institute of Technology faculty
University of Helsinki alumni
University of Pennsylvania alumni
Harvard University alumni
Sociologists of science
Members of the European Academy of Sciences and Arts
Members of the Finnish Academy of Science and Letters
Finnish biographers
Historians of science
Women biographers
Women historians